Live in Concert 1979 is the title of a video by French singer Amanda Lear, first released in 1980.

Background
The video originally consisted of highlights from Amanda's 1979 concert in Hamburg, Germany, filmed during her heyday as a disco singer and directed by Denis Taranto. The 30-minute material was released in 1980 with different covers as Amanda Lear Live and Live in Concert and featured mostly tracks from albums I Am a Photograph, Sweet Revenge and Never Trust a Pretty Face. Approximately half of the concert repertoire uses lip-synching.

In 2008, an expanded version of the video was released on DVD, including more songs, with the live material interspersed with clips from rehearsals. Behind-the-scenes footage is also included where Amanda is seen talking in French, Italian, English and occasionally German. Her husband, Alain-Philippe Malagnac d'Argens de Villèle, whom the singer had married just months before filming, also features in the video. In addition, on the 2008 DVD release a 1978 French interview was included.

Track listing

VHS version
"Hollywood Flashback" (Intro)
"Black Holes"
"Blood and Honey"
"Queen of Chinatown"
"Enigma (Give a Bit of Mmh to Me)"
"Tomorrow"
"Follow Me"
"Forget It"
"Never Trust a Pretty Face"
"Fashion Pack"

DVD version
"Run Baby Run" (Intro)
"La Bagarre"
"Black Holes"
"Forget It"
"Hollywood Flashback"
"Just a Gigolo"
"Miroir"
"Blood and Honey"
"Queen of Chinatown"
"Enigma (Give a Bit of Mmh to Me)"
"Tomorrow"
"Follow Me"
"Run Baby Run" (Interlude)
"Intellectually"
"Never Trust a Pretty Face"
"Fashion Pack"

Credits
 Chief operators: Pablo Salas, Yves Dahan
 Assistant operators: Jean-Paul Sergent, Bernard Guibert
 Sound: Rene Moire
 Editor: Violette Marfaing
 All songs property of Ariola Eurodisc Munich
 World copyright: Jet Set 1979

Release history

References

External links

1980 video albums
Live video albums